Slovenia participated in the Eurovision Song Contest 2014 with the song "Round and Round" written by Raay, Tinkara Kovač, Hannah Mancini and Tina Piš. The song was performed by Tinkara Kovač. Slovenian broadcaster Radiotelevizija Slovenija (RTV Slovenija) organised the national final EMA 2014 in order to select the Slovenian entry for the 2014 contest in Copenhagen, Denmark. Seven entries competed in the national final where the winner was selected over two rounds of voting. In the first round, the top two entries were selected by a three-member jury panel. In the second round, "Round and Round" performed by Tinkara Kovač was selected as the winner entirely by a public vote.

Slovenia was drawn to compete in the second semi-final of the Eurovision Song Contest which took place on 8 May 2014. Performing during the show in position 14, "Round and Round" was announced among the top 10 entries of the second semi-final and therefore qualified to compete in the final on 10 May. It was later revealed that Slovenia placed tenth out of the 15 participating countries in the semi-final with 52 points. In the final, Slovenia performed in position 17 and placed twenty-fifth out of the 26 participating countries, scoring 9 points.

Background 

Prior to the 2014 contest, Slovenia had participated in the Eurovision Song Contest nineteen times since its first entry in 1993. Slovenia's highest placing in the contest, to this point, has been seventh place, which the nation achieved on two occasions: in 1995 with the song "Prisluhni mi" performed by Darja Švajger and in 2001 with the song "Energy" performed by Nuša Derenda. The country's only other top ten result was achieved in 1997 when Tanja Ribič performing "Zbudi se" placed tenth. Since the introduction of semi-finals to the format of the contest in 2004, Slovenia had thus far only managed to qualify to the final on two occasions. In 2013, "Straight into Love" performed by Hannah failed to qualify to the final.

The Slovenian national broadcaster, Radiotelevizija Slovenija (RTV Slovenija), broadcasts the event within Slovenia and organises the selection process for the nation's entry. After two deadline extensions, RTV Slovenija confirmed Slovenia's participation in the 2014 Eurovision Song Contest on 17 January 2014 after being able to find the necessary funding for participation. The Slovenian entry for the Eurovision Song Contest has traditionally been selected through a national final entitled Evrovizijska Melodija (EMA), which has been produced with variable formats. To this point, the broadcaster has only foregone the use of this national final in 2013 when the Slovenian entry was internally selected. For 2014, the broadcaster opted to organise EMA 2014 to select the Slovenian entry. RTV Slovenija Eurovision project manager Miša Molk and Head of the Slovenian Eurovision delegation Aleksander Radić were appointed as organisers of the competition.

Before Eurovision

EMA 2014 
EMA 2014 was the 18th edition of the Slovenian national final format Evrovizijska Melodija (EMA). The competition was used by RTV Slovenija to select Slovenia's entry for the Eurovision Song Contest 2014 and was broadcast on TV SLO1 and online via the official Eurovision Song Contest website eurovision.tv.

Competing entries 
29 artists and composers were directly invited by the broadcaster to submit entries. An additional 42 entries received by the broadcaster from artists who did not receive an invitation were also considered. An expert committee consisting of Miša Molk (RTV Slovenija Eurovision project manager), Darja Švajger (singer, vocal coach and 1995 and 1999 Slovenian Eurovision entrant) and Andrea F. (radio host, musician and producer) selected seven artists and songs for the competition from the received submissions. The competing artists were announced on 7 February 2014. Among the competing artists was former Slovenian Eurovision contestant Omar Naber who represented Slovenia in 2005.

Final 
EMA 2014 took place on 8 March 2014 at the RTV Slovenija Studio 1 in Ljubljana, hosted by Ula Furlan. In addition to the performances of the competing entries, 2011 Slovenian Eurovision entrant Maja Keuc performed as a guest. The winner was selected over two rounds of public voting. In the first round, the top two entries were selected to proceed to the second round. In the second round, "Spet/Round and Round" performed by Tinkara Kovač was selected as the winner.

At Eurovision

According to Eurovision rules, all nations with the exceptions of the host country and the "Big Five" (France, Germany, Italy, Spain and the United Kingdom) are required to qualify from one of two semi-finals in order to compete for the final; the top ten countries from each semi-final progress to the final. The European Broadcasting Union (EBU) split up the competing countries into six different pots based on voting patterns from previous contests, with countries with favourable voting histories put into the same pot. On 20 January 2014, a special allocation draw was held which placed each country into one of the two semi-finals, as well as which half of the show they would perform in. Slovenia was placed into the second semi-final, to be held on 8 May 2014, and was scheduled to perform in the second half of the show.

Once all the competing songs for the 2014 contest had been released, the running order for the semi-finals was decided by the shows' producers rather than through another draw, so that similar songs were not placed next to each other. Slovenia was set to perform in position 14, following the entry from Greece and before the entry from Romania.

In Slovenia, the semi-finals of the contest were broadcast on RTV SLO2 and the final was broadcast on RTV SLO1 and Televizija Maribor. The contest was also broadcast via radio with the second semi-final and final airing on Radio Val 202 and Radio Maribor. All shows featured commentated by Andrej Hofer. The Slovenian spokesperson, who announced the Slovenian votes during the final, was Ula Furlan.

Semi-final 
Tinkara Kovač took in technical rehearsals on 30 April and 3 May, followed by dress rehearsals on 7 and 8 May. This included the jury final on 7 May where professional juries of each country, responsible for 50 percent of each country's vote, watched and voted on the competing entries.

The Slovenian performance featured Kovač performing in a blue dress and playing the flute. The stage colours transitioned from blue to gold as the song progressed, and the main cube structure of the stage emitted dotted yellow lights which resembled a starry sky. The LED screen floor projected circles turning around Kovač. Kovač was joined by four on-stage backing vocalists: Manca Špik, Nika Zorjan, Lea Sirk and the co-composer of "Round and Round" Raay (Aleš Vovk).

At the end of the show, Slovenia was announced as having finished in the top 10 and subsequently qualifying for the grand final. It was later revealed that Slovenia placed tenth in the semi-final, receiving a total of 52 points.

Final 
Shortly after the second semi-final, a winners' press conference was held for the ten qualifying countries. As part of this press conference, the qualifying artists took part in a draw to determine which half of the grand final they would subsequently participate in. This draw was done in the order the countries appeared in the semi-final running order. Slovenia was drawn to compete in the second half. Following this draw, the shows' producers decided upon the running order of the final, as they had done for the semi-finals. Slovenia was subsequently placed to perform in position 17, following the entry from Italy and before the entry from Finland.

Tinkara Kovač once again took part in dress rehearsals on 9 and 10 May before the final, including the jury final where the professional juries cast their final votes before the live show. Tinkara Kovač performed a repeat of her semi-final performance during the final on 10 May. Slovenia placed twenty-fifth in the final, scoring 9 points.

Voting

Points awarded to Slovenia

Points awarded by Slovenia

Detailed voting results
The following members comprised the Slovene jury:
 Helena Blagne (jury chairperson)singer
 Anže Langus Petrovićmusician, composer, producer
 Robert Piklsinger, guitar player, composer
 Izak Koširsinger, music journalist, author
 Alja Omladič (Alya)singer

References

2014
Countries in the Eurovision Song Contest 2014
Eurovision